Langjan Nature Reserve, is situated in Limpopo province, South Africa, on the R521 to Alldays, west of Makhado, close to the Blouberg Nature Reserve

This  reserve was established in 1954 to preserve the last autochthonous population of Oryx gazella. It is located between 22° 47'S and 22° 52'S and 29° 11'E and 29° 17'E and straddles the Brak River running approximately from south to north.

The vegetation is referred to as "arid sweet Bushveld"

Endemic species

Some of the important fauna found in the reserve include:
 Oryx gazella - gemsbok
 Psammobates oculifer - serrated tortoise, 
 Typhlosaurus lineatus subtaeniatus - Striped blind legless skink, 
 Scelotes limpopoensis albiventris - Limpopo burrowing skink, 
 Colopus wahlbergii wahlbergii - Wahlberg's Kalahari gecko

See also 
 Protected areas of South Africa

References

Nature reserves in South Africa